Gao Kanghao (born 23 October 1999) is a Chinese footballer currently playing as a forward for Chinese club Yuxi Yukun.

Career statistics

Club
.

References

1999 births
Living people
Chinese footballers
Association football forwards
China League One players
Guangdong South China Tiger F.C. players
Shaanxi Chang'an Athletic F.C. players